Clanculus personatus, common name the masked clanculus, is a species of sea snail, a marine gastropod mollusk in the family Trochidae, the top snails.

Description
The size of the shell attains 16 mm. The heavy, solid shell has a low conical shape. It is umbilicated and carinated. Its color is white, or suffused with a faint rose tint, with a series of small rose-colored maculations above the periphery and sometimes at the suture. The base of the shell is white or faintly marked with rose around the outer border. The about five whorls are slightly convex. They are separated by subcanaliculate sutures. The outline of the spire is a little convex. The first two whorls are smooth and eroded. The following are granose-lirate, the penultimate with 5 or 6, the last with 11 or 12 series of very distinct rounded granules, the 5th or 6th forming the periphery. The interstices are decussated by fine oblique and spiral striulae, which are sometimes obsolete. The body whorl is carinated at the periphery, lightly deflected toward the aperture, and much flattened there. The base of the shell is a trifle convex, the middle portion concave toward the umbilicus. The tetragonal aperture is very oblique and almost horizontal. The upper lip is straight, bearing a strong tubercular tooth midway. The outer and basal lips are well rounded, thickened and plicate-denticulate within. The basal margin is decidedly expanded and curved. The columella is very oblique, concave  and toward the insertion, its edge scarcely reflexed, simple, bearing a single triangular projection or tooth below the middle, and terminating in a very strong, quadrate, biplicate tooth at its base. The parietal wall is wrinkled. The umbilicus penetrates deeper than the insertion of the columella and is bordered by a plicate rib. The peristome is much thickened inside.

Distribution
This marine species is endemic to Australia and occurs off South Australia, Tasmania, Victoria and Western Australia.

References
Notes

Bibliography
 Philippi, R.A. 1846. Diagnoses testaceorum quorundam novarum. Malakozoologische Blätter 1846: 97-106
 Philippi, R.A. 1849. Trochidae. 73-120, pls 36-39 in Küster, H.C. (ed). Systematisches Conchylien-Cabinet von Martini und Chemnitz. Nürnberg : Bauer & Raspe Vol. II.
 Adams, A. 1853. Contributions towards a monograph of the Trochidae, a family of gastropodous Mollusca. Proceedings of the Zoological Society of London 1851(19): 150-192
 Pritchard, G.B. & Gatliff, J.H. 1902. Catalogue of the marine shells of Victoria. Part V. Proceedings of the Royal Society of Victoria 14(2): 85-138
 Cotton, B.C. & Godfrey, F.K. 1934. South Australian Shells. Part 11. South Australian Naturalist 15(3): 77-92
 Cotton, B.C. 1959. South Australian Mollusca. Archaeogastropoda. Handbook of the Flora and Fauna of South Australia. Adelaide : South Australian Government Printer 449 pp
 Macpherson, J.H. & Gabriel, C.J. 1962. Marine Molluscs of Victoria. Melbourne : Melbourne University Press & National Museum of Victoria 475 pp.
 Wilson, B.R. & Gillett, K. 1982. The colourful shells of Australia. How to identify them. Sydney : AH & AW Reed 288 pp.
 Wells, F.E. & Bryce, C.W. 1986. Seashells of Western Australia. Perth : Western Australian Museum 207 pp.
 Wilson, B. 1993. Australian Marine Shells. Prosobranch Gastropods. Kallaroo, Western Australia : Odyssey Publishing Vol. 1 408 pp.
 Jansen, P. 1995. A review of the genus Clanculus Montfort, 1810 (Gastropoda: Trochidae) in Australia, with description of a new subspecies and the introduction of a nomen novum. Vita Marina 43(1-2): 39-62

External links
 To Biodiversity Heritage Library (3 publications)
 To World Register of Marine Species
 

personatus
Gastropods of Australia
Gastropods described in 1849
Taxa named by Rodolfo Amando Philippi